Arlo the Alligator Boy is a 2021 American 2D animated adventure musical film directed by Ryan Crego in his directorial debut. The film is led by Michael J. Woodard and Mary Lambert in their debut acting roles as Arlo and Bertie respectively. 

The film premiered on Netflix on April 16, 2021, and received positive reviews from critics. The film was followed by a streaming television series titled I Heart Arlo in August 2021.

Plot
Arlo Beauregard, a boy who is half-human and half-alligator, is placed in a sewage drain under New York City shortly after his birth, where he is taken by a stream of water into the ocean. Arriving in a swamp, Arlo is adopted and raised by a woman named Edmée. As a teenager, Arlo wishes to interact with other people but fears his alligator appearance will not be accepted by society. Edmée gives him his birth wristband on his fifteenth birthday and reveals to Arlo that he is from New York, and unaware that he was actually abandoned, Arlo decides to travel to the city to find his biological father, Ansel Beauregard.

While traveling, Arlo is spotted by a person who contacts two alligator hunters, Ruff and Stucky, to retrieve him using a creature known as "the Beast". After the hunters find him, Arlo is rescued by Bertie, who is also a teenager. At a wrestling club, the pair meet Furlecia, Teeny Tiny Tony, and Alia, who agree to drive Arlo and Bertie to NYC after they help rescue their friend Marcellus from an aquarium.

Arriving in NYC, the group spots Ansel Beauregard, an entrepreneur who announces his plan to rebuild part of the city near the seashore. Leaving his group after finding a way to talk to him, Arlo is told by Ansel that he is not his son, but Arlo disagrees. In an attempt to help, Ansel reveals his project to remodel the seashore environment of NYC into a large city, and tries to get Arlo to change his image, shocking him, and sends him away. Disappointed and alone, Arlo enters a sewage drain and is later found by the rest of his group at the same seashore site for Ansel's project, who then teach them that no matter how different he is, his flaws are what makes him who he is.

At the Met Gala that evening, Arlo and his friends break in but are secretly followed by Ruff, Stucky and the Beast. Soon after, Arlo interrupts the gala and Ansel tries to tell him the truth. However, Arlo is then captured by Ruff and Stucky. After Ansel manages to rescue Arlo, he reveals to an audience that he is, in fact, Arlo's father and also half-bird. He explains he only gave him up just to hide his half-animal identity and wants Arlo to forgive him to start over their kinship. Delighted, Arlo hugs his father and forgives him, but turns down living with him in favor of living with his friends instead, and accepts Bertie as a member of the group as well. Additionally, Ansel decides to let them move to and rebuild the seashore part of the city as it was in better condition, and Arlo officially accepts it as where he truly belongs.

In a mid-credits scene, Edmée receives a postcard and learns about Arlo's new life.

Voice cast
 Michael J. Woodard as Arlo Beauregard, an alligator boy
 Mary Lambert as Bertie, a teenage human giantess
 Haley Tju as Alia, a tiger girl
 Jonathan Van Ness as Furlecia, a pink flamboyant furball-like creature
 Brett Gelman as Marcellus, a fish creature with legs who does not like children
 Tony Hale as Teeny Tiny Tony, a rodent-like creature and con-man
 Annie Potts as Edmée, Arlo's adoptive mother
 Flea as Ruff, an alligator-hunting hillbilly
 Jennifer Coolidge as Stucky, an alligator-hunting hillbilly and Ruff's partner
 Vincent Rodriguez III as Ansel Beauregard, Arlo's biological father and billionaire
 Fred Tatasciore as the Beast, a dog-like monster owned by Ruff & Stucky

Production
The film was announced by Netflix in November 2020 with Ryan Crego as director. The film's soundtrack was released by Capitol Records on April 16, 2021.

 Track listing

Reception

Critical response
 From The New York Times, Amy Nicholson wrote that "Long before the motley crew crashes the Met Gala, it's clear that director Ryan Crego is bolting wacky gee-gaws onto a rote plot" while also stating that "several gags pay off". Writing for Pajiba, Kristy Puchko said the LGBT representation in the film was "not only welcomed but groundbreaking", and gave praise to the storytelling, characters, and animation.

Accolades

Television series
The streaming series I Heart Arlo was released on Netflix on August 27, 2021, consisting of 19 episodes.

References

External links
 
 

2021 films
2021 animated films
2021 adventure films
2021 directorial debut films
2020s American animated films
2020s children's animated films
2020s musical films
American flash animated films
American children's animated adventure films
American children's animated musical films
Animated films about crocodilians
Animated teen films
Capitol Records soundtracks
English-language Netflix original films
Netflix Animation films
Universal Music Group soundtracks
Animated films set in New York City
2020s English-language films